A village lock-up is a historic building once used for the temporary detention of people in England and Wales, mostly where official prisons or criminal courts were beyond easy walking distance. Lockups were often used for the confinement of drunks, who were usually released the next day, or to hold people being brought before the local magistrate. The archetypal form comprises a small room with a single door and a narrow slit window, grating or holes.  Most lock-ups feature a tiled or stone-built dome or spire as a roof and are built from brick, stone and/or timber.

Such a room was built in many shapes; many are round, which gives rise to a sub-description: the punishment or village round-house. Village lock-ups, though usually freestanding, were often attached to walls, tall pillar/tower village crosses or incorporated into other buildings. Varying in architectural strength and ornamentation, they were all built to perform the same function.

Nicknames and forms
They have acquired local nicknames and descriptions including blind-house, bone-house, bridewell, village cage, punishment cage, jug, kitty, lobby, guard-house, round-house/roundhouse, tower and watch-house.

Rise of the village lock-up

The majority of surviving village lock-ups date from the 18th and 19th centuries when rural communities struggled to police thefts, burglaries, shootings, drunkenness, the obstruction of watchmen and the stealing of livestock. During this period a number of lock-ups were built, by official decree, as a temporary place of detention for local rogues and miscreants until they could be removed to a town. For example, in 1790 the Derbyshire court of quarter sessions issued an order that required that "all parishes in the county where there is not already a Round House, House of Correction, or Gaol, shall provide a place of temporary confinement for the reception of vagrants, paupers, felons and the like." Over time they became synonymous with drunkenness and many references to this coupling can be found in famous works of literature, including Barnaby Rudge (1841) by Charles Dickens, and The Water-Babies (1863) by Charles Kingsley, which contains the line:

Put him in the round house till he gets sober

 
An 1830 description of a lock-up in Taunton describes "... a hole into which drunken and bleeding men were thrust and allowed to remain until the following day when the constable with his staff of office take the poor, crippled and dirty wretches before a magistrate, followed by half the boys and idle fellows of the town."

Some lock-ups also had stocks, ducking stools, pillories, or pinfolds alongside them and the origins of the 18th-century village lock-up evolved from much earlier examples of holding cells and devices.

The Oxford English Dictionary refers to a round-house as a place of detention for arrested persons and dates its first written usage to 1589.

Decline and later uses

The rooms fell out of use when the County Police Act was introduced in 1839 and more stations were built with their own holding facilities. The Act allowed Justices of the Peace to set up a paid police force in each county and made it compulsory for that force to be provided with proper police stations and secure cells. The village lock-up became a redundant edifice as a result and only a small fraction have survived.

During World War II many were used by the Home Guard as sentry posts and arms stores.

In recent decades many owners have repaired these structures and/or seen nomination as listed buildings; a presumption of acceptance applies to buildings earlier than 1840. Some are local heritage attractions; others are in a ruinous state; others have been converted into parts of homes, yards or gardens.

A register of these structures, including those which have been lost, is held by the Village Lock-up Association.

Notable village lock-ups

The crest of Everton Football Club features Everton Lock-Up which still stands on Everton Brow, Liverpool.

D. H. Lawrence and his German-born wife Frieda had to report to the lock-up in Wirksworth during the First World War when they lived at Middleton-by-Wirksworth.

The roof of Castle Cary lock-up is reputed to have inspired the design of the modern British police helmet.

In 1281 an analogous building (the Tun) was erected in Cornhill, central London – a two-storey barrel shaped design with a single cell on each floor.

Surviving lock-ups in England and Wales

England
Bedfordshire
Barton-le-Clay, Clophill, Harrold, Silsoe

Berkshire
Aldermaston, Pangbourne

Bristol (City of)
Westbury-on-Trym

Buckinghamshire
Amersham, Great Missenden, Wendover, West Wycombe

Cambridgeshire
Broughton, Burwell, Coveney, Eaton Socon, Fen Drayton, Fenstanton, Litlington, (Holywell-cum-)Needingworth, Parson Drove, Sawtry

Cheshire
Farndon, Farnworth, Kelsall,  Winsford

Cumbria
Lower Allithwaite

Derbyshire
Alfreton, Ashbourne?, Curbar, Cromford (Derwent Valley Mills), Sandiacre, Smisby, Swarkestone (ruin), Ticknall, Wirksworth

Dorset
Gillingham, Lyme Regis, Swanage

Durham
Barnard Castle, Staindrop

East Sussex
Pevensey

Essex

Bradwell on Sea, Braintree, Canewdon, Great Bardfield, Great Dunmow, Orsett, Steeple Bumpstead, Thaxted (in Guildhall), Tollesbury

Gloucestershire
 Bisley, Bibury, Cirencester, Moreton-in-Marsh, Stroud, Thornbury, Westerleigh

Greater London
Cranford, Hampstead, Petersham

Hampshire
Easton (demolished), Odiham

Herefordshire
Bridstow, Leintwardine, Yarpole

Hertfordshire
Anstey, Ashwell, Barley, Buntingford, Shenley

Kent
Dartford, Lenham, Wateringbury

Lancashire
Bury, North Meols, Poulton le Fylde?, Prescot

Leicestershire
Barrow-upon-Soar, Breedon-on-the-Hill, Castle Donington?, Packington, Worthington

Lincolnshire
Deeping St James, Digby

Merseyside
Everton, Wavertree

Norfolk
Docking, Great Yarmouth, Thetford?

Northamptonshire
Weldon

Northumberland
Stamfordham

Nottinghamshire
Edwinstowe?, Mansfield Woodhouse?, Tuxford

Oxfordshire
Banbury, Bicester, Burford, Filkins, Stonesfield, Wheatley

Shropshire
Prees

Somerset

Bathford, Buckland Dinham, Castle Cary, Frome, Kelston, Kilmersdon, Kingsbury Episcopi, Mells, Merriott, Monkton Combe, Nunney, Publow in Pensford, Nether Stowey, Watchett, Wells, Wrington

Staffordshire
Alton, Gnosall, Penkridge, Stafford: Forebridge

Suffolk
Sproughton, Stoke by Nayland, Woolpit

Sussex
East Grinstead

Surrey
Charlwood, Ewell, Lingfield

Wiltshire

Box, Bradford on Avon, Bromham, Chippenham, Devizes, Great Bedwyn,  Heytesbury, Hilperton, Lacock, Luckington, Shrewton, Steeple Ashton, Trowbridge, Warminster

Yorkshire
Addingham?, Fairburn, Illingworth, Heptonstall, Holmfirth (Holm Valley), Hunmanby, Workhouse Farm of Holme upon Spalding Moor Horbury in Wakefield, Kirkheaton, Luddenden, Nether Poppleton?, North Stainley?, Oswaldkirk, Rastrick, Rotherham, Seamer, Snaith, Throp Arch, Topcliffe?, Wath-upon-Dearne

Wales
Flintshire
Bagillt?, Hawarden

Gwynedd
Barmouth, Clynnog Fawr

Wrexham
Ruabon

Notes

Gallery

See also
 Bridewell Palace
 One-room jail

References

Further reading

Buildings and structures in England
Prisons in the United Kingdom
Street furniture